Chaetosopus is a genus of beetles in the family Cerambycidae, containing the following species:

 Chaetosopus contiguus Napp & Martins, 1988
 Chaetosopus infalsatus Napp & Martins, 1988
 Chaetosopus violaceus (Martins, 1973)

References

Compsocerini